Skylark Foods Limited is a subsidiary of Skylark Group, an Indian company that specialises in chicken and meat processing, and poultry products for poultry usage. It holds the same position in North India as Venky's holds in South India.

History
Founded in 1985 in village Anta, Distt. Jind, Haryana as Skylark Poultry Farms by the Dhull and Deswal family, it mainly produced day-old layer and broiler chicks for the poultry markets of North India. Skylark started its first operation with broiler breeding & hatchery with a capacity of 1000 broiler breeders.

Status
The Skylark Group is a 12 billion conglomerate and a large Asian poultry company. The group has diversified into fields including: poultry, processed food, meat processing and hatcheries. Skylark commissioned commercial broiler farms in 2008.

Milestones

start godown at hyderabad

Products
Skylark mainly produce poultry products, including both food products and poultry farming equipment and feed

Poultry sales

Skylark markets fresh chilled and frozen chicken in institutions and retail segments in different pack sizes under brand name "Nutrich" in North India. Their products range includes whole chicken, chicken boneless (breast & thigh), drumsticks, full legs, wings, lollipops etc. Their clients include retail stores, commercial kitchens, and franchisees outlets. The processing plant of Skylark is at Food Park, HSIIDC Industrial Estate, RAI, Haryana which is near Delhi.

Hatching and breeding
The company has separate hatcheries for Grand Parent, Parent Stock and commercials at 5 different locations in Haryana, Himachal Pradesh and Gujarat. Skylark have as well established a distribution network for the sale of DOC's / hatching eggs in Haryana Punjab, Himachal Pradesh, Uttar Pradesh, Gujarat, Rajasthan states.

Skylark is the largest producer of broilers in North India. Skylark has a capacity of about 3 million broilers per month which is a huge number as compared to other broiler companies in India.

Skylark have a poultry feed mill in Jind district and has a production capacity of 800 tonnes per day. It was established in 2003. This mill produce feed for G.P., Parent Stock, Layer Stock and commercial broiler farming having their respective starters and finishers range.

Skylark provides technical assistance to farmers via a disease diagnostic laboratory at Jind, Haryana.

References

Companies based in Haryana
Meat companies of India
Poultry industry in India
Indian companies established in 1985
1985 establishments in Haryana